The Charlemagne building is a high-rise in the European Quarter of Brussels, Belgium, which houses the Directorate-General for Economic and Financial Affairs, the Directorate-General for Trade and, since 2015, the Internal Audit Service of the Commission. 

The building has 3 wings and 15 floors. It is located at 170, rue de la Loi/Wetstraat, in the City of Brussels, one of the 19 municipalities forming the Brussels-Capital Region. The postal code for the municipality is 1000, but the postal code for the European Commission is 1049.

History
The building was designed by Jacques Cuisinier and constructed in 1967 at the same time as the Berlaymont Building to group together more scattered departments of the European Commission. However, with the Commission refusing to share the Berlaymont with the Council of the European Union, Charlemagne was given to the Council's secretariat in 1971. This had previously been located in the city centre.

The Council moved out to the Justus Lipsius building in 1995 allowing it to be renovated. The renovation was completed in 1998 by Helmut Jahn, replacing the largely concrete exterior with a glass one. After the restoration it was occupied by the Commission, further grouping the Union's offices around the Schuman roundabout.

It was briefly considered as the future HQ of the European External Action Service, established in 2010, but was discounted on image grounds; as it houses RELEX, people would see the EEAS as a RELEX-plus rather than a unique body outside of the Commission.

See also
    Brussels and the European Union
    Berlaymont building
    Madou Plaza Tower
    Justus Lipsius building
    Lex building
    Europa building

See also 

 European commission
 Berlaymont building
 Breydel building
 Convent Van Maerlant
 Madou Plaza Tower
 Brussels and the European Union
 Institutional seats of the European Union

References

 Emporis building information
 Dow Corning construction
 European Navigator

European Commission
Buildings and structures in Brussels
Buildings and structures of the European Union
European quarter of Brussels
Skyscraper office buildings in Belgium

Office buildings completed in 1967